Capron House may refer to:

in the United States
(by state then town)
Capron-Phillips House, Coventry, Connecticut, listed on the National Register of Historic Places (NRHP)
Casa Caprona, Ft. Pierce, Florida, NRHP-listed
Capron House (Attleboro, Massachusetts), NRHP-listed
George Capron House, Taunton, Massachusetts, NRHP-listed
Charles Capron House, Uxbridge, Massachusetts, NRHP-listed